Jingalup is a town in the Great Southern region of Western Australia located between the towns of Kojonup and Cranbrook. The town is located on Murrin Brook, which is a tributary of the Tone River.

The area was explored by Francis Thomas Gregory in 1846; he first recorded the name Jingalup. The area was eventually opened to agriculture. By 1918 the local farmers requested that a townsite be declared, and proposed the name be Mybrup. A town hall which was also used as a school and a recreation ground had been built by 1922, and the community knew the area as Jingalup. The town was gazetted in 1924.

The name is Aboriginal in origin and is a contraction of the name of a nearby well, Kodjingalup Well.

References 

Great Southern (Western Australia)